Kailey or Cailey is a surname and a feminine first or middle name. 

The name has multiple origins depending on the spelling. In English it means "keeper of the keys". In Scottish Gaelic it derives from "Cèilidh", meaning "social celebration". "Kailey" is Greek for "rare beauty". It is also a Welsh name meaning "slender". From Irish/Gaelic origin, Kailey means "slim and fair". In Hebrew it means "laurel", "crown" or "princess." Kailey is also a surname found in the Ramgharia and Jatts peoples of Punjab, India.

The name became more popular as a first name in the United States, Britain and Australia following the release of the British rock group Marillion's song "Kayleigh" in 1985.

People with the given name
Kailey Leila, Canadian-born Guyanese footballer
Kailey Willis, Maltese footballer

People with the surname 
 Maninder Kailey, Indian Punjabi songwriter
 Matt Kailey (1955–2014), transgender American writer and activist

Fictional characters
Kailey Hopkins, American Girl character

See also
 Kaylee, a given name; includes Kayli
 Kayleigh (disambiguation); includes Kaliegh
 Kaley (disambiguation)
 Kaili (disambiguation)

References

English feminine given names